Isometrus is a genus of scorpion belonging and being eponymous to the family Buthidae. Some species are currently assigned to the genus Reddyanus.

Distribution
The species of this genus are found in south and southeast Asia and in Oceania, with the exception of Isometrus maculatus which is pantropical.

Description
They are medium sized buthids, where the adults have a body length of 30 to 75 mm. Pedipalps are orthobothriotaxic. Chelal trichobothrium db is located between dt and et. There are 3 to 5 pairs of lateral eyes. Tibial spurs are absent on all legs. Movable and fixed fingers of pedipalps consists with six rows of granules.

Current species
 Isometrus amboli Sulakhe, 2020
 Isometrus antillanus Thorell, 1876
 Isometrus armatus Pocock, 1891
 Isometrus atherii Amir & Kamaluddin, 2008
 Isometrus atomarius Simon, 1884
 Isometrus bituberculatus Pocock, 1891
 Isometrus chinensis Karsch, 1879
 Isometrus devillei Becker, 1880
 Isometrus feae Thorell, 1889
 Isometrus formosus Pocock, 1894
 Isometrus garyi Lourenço & Huber, 2002
 Isometrus gracilis Thorell, 1876
 Isometrus hainanensis Lourenço, Qi & Zhu, 2005
 Isometrus infuscatus Pocock, 1891
 Isometrus isadensis Tikader & Bastawade, 1983
 Isometrus kovariki Sulakhe, Dandekar, Mukherjee, Pandey, Ketkar, Padhye & Bastawade, 2020
 Isometrus lao Lourenço & Leguin, 2012
 Isometrus liaqatii Amir & Kamaluddin, 2008
 Isometrus maculatus (DeGeer, 1778)
 Isometrus mesor Simon, 1884
 Isometrus pallidimanus Karsch, 1879
 Isometrus papuensis Werner, 1916
 Isometrus phipsoni Oates, 1888
 Isometrus sonticus Karsch, 1879
 Isometrus tamhini Sulakhe, Dandekar, Padhye & Bastawade, 2020
 Isometrus thorellii Koch & Keyserling, 1885
 Isometrus thurstoni Pocock, 1893
 Isometrus thwaitesi Pocock, 1897
 Isometrus weberi Karsch, 1882

Former species
All species are assigned to Reddyanus.

 Isometrus acanthurus Pocock, 1899
 Isometrus assamensis Oates, 1888
 Isometrus basilicus Karsch, 1879
 Isometrus besucheti Vachon, 1982
 Isometrus bilyi Kovařík, 2003
 Isometrus brachycentrus Pocock, 1899
 Isometrus corbeti Tikader & Batawade, 1983
 Isometrus deharvengi Lourenço & Duhem, 2010
 Isometrus heimi Vachon, 1976
 Isometrus khammamensis Kovařík, 2003
 Isometrus krasenskyi Kovařík, 1998
 Isometrus kurkai Kovařík, 1997
 Isometrus loebli Vachon, 1982
 Isometrus melanodactylus (L. Koch, 1867)
 Isometrus navaiae Kovařík, 1998
 Isometrus petrzelkai Kovařík, 2003
 Isometrus problematicus Kovařík, 2003
 Isometrus rigidulus Pocock, 1897
 Isometrus tibetanus Lourenço & Zhu, 2008
 Isometrus vittatus Pocock, 1900
 Isometrus zideki Kovařík, 1994

References

 Ehrenberg, 1828 : Arachnoidea, Scorpiones. in Hemprich & Ehrenberg, Symbolae physicae seu icones et descriptiones animalium evertebratorum sepositis insectis quae ex itinere per Africanum borealem et Asiam occidentalem. Friderici Guielmi Hemprich et Christiani Godofredi Ehrenberg, studio novae aut illustratae redierunt. Percensuit editit Dr. C.G. Ehrehberg. Decas I. Berolini ex officina Academica, venditur a Mittlero, Berlin.
Sulakhe, Shauri & Dandekar, Nikhil & Mukherjee, Shomen & Pandey, Malay & Ketkar, Makarand & Padhye, Anand & Bastawade, Deshabhushan. (2020). A new species of Isometrus (Scorpiones: Buthidae) from southern India. 310. 1-13. 

 
Taxa named by Christian Gottfried Ehrenberg